Tyrice Beverette (born January 28, 1995) is a professional Canadian football linebacker for the Montreal Alouettes of the Canadian Football League (CFL).

Early life
Raised in Lakewood Township, New Jersey, Beverette graduated from Lakewood High School in 2013.

College career
Beverette played college football for the Stony Brook Seawolves from 2014 to 2017 after taking a redshirt season in 2013. He played in 44 games where he had 262 tackles, 27.5 tackles for a loss, 14 sacks, five interceptions, and seven forced fumbles.

Professional career

Cincinnati Bengals
After attending a tryout, Beverette signed with the Cincinnati Bengals on May 14, 2018. However, he was released with the final cuts following training camp on September 1, 2018.

Hamilton Tiger-Cats
Beverette signed with the Hamilton Tiger-Cats on May 19, 2019. He began the season on the practice roster, but played in his first career professional game on July 26, 2019, against the Winnipeg Blue Bombers. He played in 13 regular season games where he had nine defensive tackles and 19 special teams tackles. Beverette also played in his first Grey Cup championship game, but the Tiger-Cats lost to the Blue Bombers in the 107th Grey Cup game.

He did not play in 2020 due to the cancellation of the 2020 CFL season and signed a contract extension on January 5, 2021. He played in nine regular season games in 2021 where he had seven defensive tackles and eight special teams tackles. He became a free agent upon the expiry of his contract on February 8, 2022.

Montreal Alouettes
On February 8, 2022, it was announced that Beverette had signed with the Montreal Alouettes.

References

External links
 Montreal Alouettes bio

1995 births
Living people
American football linebackers
American players of Canadian football
Canadian football linebackers
Hamilton Tiger-Cats players
Lakewood High School (New Jersey) alumni
Montreal Alouettes players
Players of American football from New Jersey
Sportspeople from Lakewood Township, New Jersey
Stony Brook Seawolves football players